Datuk Awang Jabar Secondary School (SMKDAJ) is a secondary school located in Kampung Jambu, Marang, Terengganu, Malaysia.

The school was originally named Jambu Bongkok Secondary School since its inception in 2006 in conjunction with the school located at Kampung Jambu Bongkok.

It was subsequently renamed as Datuk Awang Jabar Secondary School, after the elected representative and member of parliament, Datuk Awang Jabar, from Kampung Merchang, with approval from the Ministry of Education on 20 May 2015.

Datuk Awang Jabar Secondary School is located approximately 58 miles from Kuala Terengganu and 24 kilometers from the town of Dungun. The school schooling session began on January 2, 2006. Administration led by Tuan Haji Hasan bin Muda (Senior Assistant of Student Affairs), Haji Ibrahim bin Salleh (Senior Assistant of Co-Curriculum), followed by Tuan Haji Mohd Yunus bin Zakaria as Senior Assistant of Administration. Mrs. Che Mek Kamariah Binti Che Yem is the pioneer of this school principals. In 2006 the school administration shouldered by 10 teachers and 4 support staff. The first group of students who enroll in this school of 142 students ranging from 1, 2 and 4. Now, that number increased to 25 teachers, support staff 7, 282 students and 12 classes operate. In the early stages, operations and administrative management school programs helped by PTA (sponsor), led by the president Mr. Mohd Arifin bin Ali and forwarded again by the Parents and Teachers Association under the chairmanship of En. Md. Zaid bin Seman.

In 2009, Jambu Bongkok Secondary School has 145 boys and 113 girls, making a total of 258 students. It has about 24 teachers.

The school participated in the competition at the national level in 2010 and 2011 of the Match Kid Witness News (KWN).

Secondary schools in Malaysia